The 2017 Turkish Basketball Presidential Cup was the 33rd edition of the Turkish Basketball Presidential Cup. The game was played between Fenerbahçe Doğuş, champions of the 2016–17 Basketbol Süper Ligi, and Banvit, the winners of the 2017 Turkish Cup.

Banvit made its second appearance, while Fenerbahçe played in its 14th President's Cup and won its 7th title.

Venue

Match details 
Luigi Datome, who had 14 points and 5 rebounds in the game, was named the Presidential Cup MVP.

References 

Presidents Cup
2016
Turkish Cup 2017